Ekaterina Vladimirovna Lobaznyuk (born June 10, 1983 in Fergana, Uzbek SSR, USSR) is a former Olympic gymnast who competed for Russia in the 2000 Olympic Games in Sydney, Australia, winning three medals. Her name is sometimes written Ekaterina Lobazniouk.

Early life 
The second daughter of a gymnastics coach (who is also a former gymnast) and a sports school director, Lobaznyuk grew up in Uzbekistan amid the strife and turbulence of the 1980s. She began her gymnastics career at the young age of six, when her mother brought her to a gym in Fergana. In the 1990s, after the USSR fell apart, the Lobaznyuk family fled to Tashkent due to violence and riots in the Fergana Valley area. The family attempted to join a circus there, but failed. Help came in 1994 thanks to her grandmother, living in Russia at the time; the Lobaznyuks eventually settled in Rubtsovsk, a city of some 170,000 people located in southwestern Siberia.

It was in Rubtsovsk that Lobaznyuk met her future coach, Valery Fyodotovich Dianov, and the two quickly became a team.

National debut 
Lobaznyuk made her debut as a junior elite gymnast in a children's meet sometime prior to 1996. Although she fell eleven times during the meet, Russian National Team coach Leonid Arkayev was very impressed with her. In 1996 she placed first in the all-around and first on floor exercise at the Russian Youth Championships (in the Candidate for Master of Sport category) and the next year won four gold and one silver medal at the Russian Cup's junior competition. Arkayev subsequently invited her to the national team's training center, located at Round Lake.

National team member
As a member of Russia's national team, Lobaznyuk attracted attention due to her well-choreographed routines and her spunky personality. In 1997 she won the all-around title at the Charleroi TopGym meet in Belgium, as well as finishing fifth in the all-around (with two additional titles in vault and balance beam) at the International Junior Tournament in Japan. It was at this meet in Japan that she gained the attention of fans worldwide with her appearance and her floor exercise, choreographed to the music "Hava Nagila".

In 1998, Lobaznyuk broke her right arm as a result of a fall off her least favorite event, the uneven bars, and missed the two biggest junior events of the year, the Junior European Championships and World Youth Games. She healed completely enough at the end of the year to win over Ukrainian gymnast Viktoria Karpenko at the Acapulco Cup in Mexico.

Rise to fame at 1999 Worlds 
1999 and 2000 were the best years of Lobaznyuk's competitive career. She was an integral part of the 1999 World Championships team from Russia that won a silver medal, as she picked up the most points overall for her team in the team final. Dianov was thrilled, saying "She performed wonderfully". Once again, she garnered a lot of attention and many more fans, partly due to ESPN's broadcast of the competition. Without her impressive performance at the World Gymnastics Championships, she might not have made it to the Olympics the next year.

Sydney, Australia was the site of the 2000 Olympic Games, and the location of the highest point in Lobaznyuk's career. She was also perhaps the top gymnast on the Olympic team, surpassing Svetlana Khorkina and Elena Zamolodchikova, the best known members of the team at the time. She won a pair of silver medals (on the beam and in the team final) and a bronze on the vault. After Zamolodchikova fell off the balance beam in the team final, Lobaznyuk wanted to get a 10.0 SV (start value) so she included a move not originally in her beam routine and promptly fell off the side of the beam. Dianov remarked afterwards, "It was a noble impulse and so it was impossible to rebuke her for it". In the all-around final, Lobaznyuk stepped out of bounds on her floor routine and misstepped on beam, resulting in a fifth-place result.

Injury 
At the 2001 Russian Cup, while performing one of her signature Yurchenko vaults, Lobaznyuk landed very hard on the mat and collapsed in pain; she had to be picked up and carried off by one of her coaches. It was revealed later that she had torn the ACL and MCL in her right knee, and surgery would be needed, which would sideline her for the remainder of the year. She had two surgeries because the first one in Moscow, Russia was not performed properly; the second took place in Johannesburg, South Africa during her visit for a rehabilitation stint. The second seemed to go well, and she returned to training in late January 2002.

The next month Lobaznyuk attempted a comeback at the Russian National Championships, performing only on beam and floor exercise while her surgically repaired knee continued to heal. She did OK in the eyes of national team coaches, but not well enough to rejoin the team, as other, younger gymnasts were coming along to take her place. With very little chance to come back for her country, Lobaznyuk decided to retire from competition shortly thereafter.

Post-gymnastics life 
Lobaznyuk now resides in Langley, British Columbia, Canada where she trains as a competitive coach alongside her mother Ludmila, who herself is a coach at the Langley Gymnastics Foundation. She is married and has a son named Alexei.

Competitive history

See also 
 List of Olympic female gymnasts for Russia

References

External links
 
 Lobaznyuk's photos at GymBox
 Lobaznyuk Set for Monday Surgery an article in International Gymnast Online, January 27, 2002

1983 births
Living people
Russian female artistic gymnasts
Gymnasts at the 2000 Summer Olympics
Olympic gymnasts of Russia
Olympic silver medalists for Russia
Olympic bronze medalists for Russia
Medalists at the World Artistic Gymnastics Championships
People from Fergana
People from Coquitlam
Olympic medalists in gymnastics
Medalists at the 2000 Summer Olympics
European champions in gymnastics